A mayor is the highest-ranking official in a municipal government such as that of a city or a town.

Mayor may also refer to:

Geography
 Lord Mayor Bay, an Arctic waterway in Kitikmeot Region, Nunavut, Canada
 Mayor Buratovich, a town in Buenos Aires Province, Argentina
 Mayor Island / Tūhua, a dormant shield volcano located off the Bay of Plenty coast of New Zealand's North Island
 Mayor Otaño, a town in the Itapúa department of Paraguay
 Mayor Square, in the Docklands area of Dublin

Offices, ranks, and titles
 Mayor (France), maire
 Mayor (Netherlands), burgemeester
 Mayor, (Майор), the lowest field officer rank in Russia, equivalent to major in most NATO armed forces
 Deputy mayor
 Lord Mayor, the mayor of a major city in the United Kingdom and some Commonwealth countries
 Lord Mayor's Day, an annual pageant in London
 Mayor of the Palace, the manager of the household of the Frankish kings
 Mayors in Brazil
 Mayors in Northern Ireland
 Mayors in Wales
 Mock mayor, a British folk tradition
 Mayor of Ock Street, a Mock Mayor tradition in Abingdon, Oxfordshire

People

People with the name
 Mayor (surname)
 Mayor Guillén de Guzmán (1205-1262), Spanish aristocrat
 Máyor (footballer) (born 1984), Spanish footballer
 Mayor McCA (AKA Christian Anderson Smith, active from 1996), Canadian musician

Arts, entertainment, and media

Fictional mayors
 Mayor (Buffy the Vampire Slayer), a character in the TV series
 Mayor of Mega-City One, a fictional office in the Judge Dredd comic strip in 2000 AD
 Mayor of the Shire, the sole elected official of the Shire in the literary works of J. R. R. Tolkien
 Mayor Quimby, a recurring character from the animated television series The Simpsons
 Mayor West, a character from the animated television series Family Guy
 Mayor Flopdinger, a character from the PBS television series Shining Time Station

Films
 Mayor (film), a 2020 American documentary film
 Mayor Cupcake, a 2011 film directed by Alex Pires
 Mayor Meenakshi, a 1976 Indian Tamil-language film by Madurai Thirumaran
 Mayor Muthanna, a 1969 Indian Kannada-language film by Siddalingaiah
 Mayor Nair, a 1966 Indian Malayalam-language film by S. R. Puttanna
 Mayor of the Sunset Strip, a 2003 documentary film on the life of Rodney Bingenheimer

Music
 Mayor of Punkville, a 1999 double live album by William Parker and his Little Huey Creative Music Orchestra
 "Mayor Que Yo", a single from the 2005 album Mas Flow 2

Television
 Dan for Mayor, a Canadian television sitcom which debuted in 2010
 Mayor of the Town (TV series), a U.S. sitcom and drama based on the radio program which aired in 1954
 "Mayored to the Mob", an episode of The Simpsons

Other uses in arts, entertainment, and media
 Mayor (musical), of 1985 by Warren Leight and Charles Strouse
 A Mayor of Delft and his Daughter, a 1655 oil painting by Dutch painter Jan Steen
 A Mayor's Life, the autobiography of New York City's 106th mayor, David N. Dinkins
 Mayor of the Town (radio program), a U.S. comedy-drama 1942-49

Buildings
 Mayor Gallery, an art gallery located in London
 Mayor Synagogue (disambiguation)

Organizations
 Mayors and Independents, a political party in the Czech Republic
 Mayors for Liberec Region, a regionalist party in the Czech Republic
 Mayors for Peace, an international organization established in 1982
 Mayors' Association, a political party in Madagascar

Sports
 Ionia Mayors, a Central League baseball team based in Ionia, Michigan 1921-22
 Lord Mayor's Cup (BRC), a Thoroughbred horse race in Brisbane
 Mayor's Cup (disambiguation)

Other uses
 Boyd v. Mayor of Wellington, a leading case in New Zealand law on the concept of indefeasibility of title (1924)
 Mayor's Court, the highest courts of judicature of the East India Company 1726-1774
 Mayor's mouse (Mus mayori), a species of rodent

See also
 Mayoral (disambiguation)
 The Mayor (disambiguation)